The Joseph Giraud House, at 442 Flint St. in Reno, Nevada, United States, is a historic house that was designed by prominent Nevada architect Frederick DeLongchamps and was built in 1914.  Also known as the Hardy House, it was listed on the National Register of Historic Places in 1984.

It was deemed significant for its architecture and for its association with sheeprancher Joseph Giraud and businessman Roy Hardy.

References

Houses in Reno, Nevada
Colonial Revival architecture in Nevada
Houses completed in 1914
Houses on the National Register of Historic Places in Nevada
National Register of Historic Places in Reno, Nevada
Frederic Joseph DeLongchamps buildings